Stanford/ITS character set is an extended ASCII character set based on SEASCII with modifications allowing compatibility with 1968 ASCII.

Usage 
It is used as an alternate character set of the SUPDUP protocol for terminals with %TOSAI and %TOFCI bits set. It is also recommended for TeX implementations on systems with large character sets.

The Knight keyboard is an example of a keyboard capable of inputting all of the defined characters excluding ⋅γδ±⊕◊∫, as they are mapped to ASCII commands NUL, HT, LF, FF, CR, ESC and DEL, respectively.

Coverage 
Each character is encoded as a single seven-bit code value. It contains all 95 printable ASCII characters along with 27 mathematical symbols and 6 Greek letters.

Code page layout

See also 
 Stanford Extended ASCII
 Incompatible Timesharing System
 SUPDUP
 TeX

References

Further reading 
  - (Historic) SUPDUP Protocol. October 1977.

Character encoding
Computer-related introductions in the 1970s